Turbott's weevil (Anagotus turbotti) is a weevil that is endemic to New Zealand. It has been found on the Hen and Chicken Islands, the Poor Knights Islands and the Three Kings Islands.

Taxonomy
New Zealand entomologist Donald Spiller first described and named this species in 1942, based on two specimens collected by E. G. Turbott from the Poor Knights Islands, in November 1940. Anagotus turbotti was named in honour of its collector.

Description
Turbott's weevil is one of the largest and most colourful of New Zealand's endemic weevils. This species is flightless and ranges in length from 18-25mm. It has conspicuous white markings and obvious tubercles.

Life cycle
The larvae of Turbott's weevils are wood borers and have been discovered in several different tree species. However they are most commonly found in ngaio and karaka trees.

Distribution and habitat
The locality from which the type specimen of this species was collected is the island of Aorangi. As well as the Poor Knights Islands, Turbott's weevil can also be found on the Three Kings Islands and on Muriwhenua of the Hen and Chicken Islands. Adult beetles have been collected from Myoporum laetum and Corynocarpus laevigatus.

Behaviour
Adult weevils are active both day and night and have been observed consuming the leaves of the ngaio tree.

Predation
The Turbott's weevil is prone to rat predation. This is due to it being large and slow moving. The extinction of its sister species, Anagotus stephenensis from the mainland was probably due to rat predation. The Turbott's weevil was probably more widespread historically, but is now only found on predator-free islands.

Conservation status and efforts
In September 2006 the Department of Conservation translocated 30 Turbott's weevils from Muriwhenua Island to Lady Alice Island, a predator free Island also in the Hen and Chicken Islands group. This was done in the hope that they would become established on that Island. To assist with their establishment the weevils were placed inside cages situated in West Bay containing tree species the weevils are known to consume.

Turbott's weevil are protected under Schedule 7 of The 1953 Wildlife Act, making it an offense to hunt, kill or possess a specimen.

References

External links

 The New Zealand Organisms register entry for Anagotus turbotti

Cyclominae
Beetles of New Zealand
Three Kings Islands
Beetles described in 1942